is a Japanese curler, born April 5, 1978 in Tokoro, Hokkaido as . She is currently the lead for Sayaka Yoshimura's team from Sapporo, Hokkaido.

Career
At age 12, Funayama began curling in her hometown Tokoro, Hokkaido, joining Akiko Katoh's junior team together with Ayumi Ogasawara (then Onodera). Funayama mainly played third for the Katoh team. The team represented Japan at four World Junior Curling Championships (1996, 1997, 1998 & 1999), winning a silver medal in 1998 and another silver in 1999. The team later represented Japan at the 2002 Winter Olympics, finishing in 8th place with a 2-7 record.

After the 2001-2002 season, Funayama moved from Hokkaido to Aomori and formed a new team with her then-teammate Ayumi Ogasawara (then Onodera), who became the skip of the new team. The team represented Japan at the 2006 Winter Olympics, where Funayama played third and Japan finished 7th with a 4-5 record, including a surprise win over one of the usual curling powerhouses, Canada. After the 2005-2006 season, Funayama and Ogasawara announced their temporary retirement. Funayama got married and had a child before returning to the sport in the 2011-12 season.

In 2011, Funayama and Ogasawara formed a new team in Sapporo, Hokkaido. The team qualified for the 2014 Winter Olympics through the Olympic Qualification Event 2013. At the Olympic Games, Funayama threw third stones under skip Ogasawara, and Japan finished in 5th place with a 4-5 record, winning against two former World Championship teams, Switzerland's Mirjam Ott and China's Wang Bingyu.

Personal life
Funayama is married and has two children. She lives in Sapporo.

Teammates
2002 Salt Lake City Olympic Games
Akiko Katoh, Skip
Ayumi Onodera, Second
Mika Konaka, Lead
Kotomi Ishizaki, Alternate
2006 Turin Olympic Games
Ayumi Onodera, Skip
Mari Motohashi, Second
Moe Meguro, Lead
Sakurako Terada, Alternate
2014 Sochi Olympic Games
Ayumi Ogasawara, Skip
Kaho Onodera, Second
Michiko Tomabechi, Lead
Chinami Yoshida, Alternate

References

External links

Japanese female curlers
Living people
1978 births
People from Kitami, Hokkaido
Curlers at the 2002 Winter Olympics
Curlers at the 2006 Winter Olympics
Curlers at the 2014 Winter Olympics
Olympic curlers of Japan
Pacific-Asian curling champions
Japanese curling champions
Sportspeople from Sapporo
20th-century Japanese women
21st-century Japanese women